Emma Richter (4 March 1888 – 15 November 1956) was a German paleontologist. She is best known for her work concerning Trilobites.

Life and career

Richter was born in Steinheim on 4 May 1888.

She spent around 45 years volunteering at the Senckenberg Museum alongside her husband Rudolf Richter. She developed a new way to assess trilobites through paloecological-biofacial assessment while representing her husband at the museum during the First World War. Richter also worked on several projects with her husband including studying 500 halftone images of trilobites for their book Die Trilobiten des Oberdevons Beiträge zur Kenntnis devonischer Trilobiten and creating a comparative database with over 44,000 images.

Richter was made an honorary member of the Paleontological Society of America in 1934 and received an honorary doctorate from the University of Tübingen in 1949.

Richter died on 15 November 1956, two months before her husband also died.

Family

Richter married Rudolf Richter, a fellow paleontologist, in 1913 and they had one daughter.

References

1888 births
1956 deaths
German paleontologists
German women paleontologists